Honghesaurus is an extinct genus of pachypleurosaur from the Anisian-age Guanling Formation of China.

Classification
The cladogram below follows Xu and colleagues (2022), when they used Youngina as a reference point for rooting the tree. Using a selection of placodonts resulted in a less resolved topology.

References

Triassic sauropterygians
Pachypleurosaurs
Fossil taxa described in 2022
Anisian life